The Saga of Tanya the Evil, known in Japan as , is a Japanese light novel series written by Carlo Zen and illustrated by Shinobu Shinotsuki. It was initially serialized on the web novel hosting website Arcadia, before Enterbrain's acquisition. The first volume was released on October 31, 2013, and twelve volumes have been released. A manga adaptation with art by Chika Tōjō began serialization in Kadokawa Shoten's Comp Ace magazine from April 26, 2016, and has been collected into 26 volumes.

Light novels

Manga

References

External links

 

Lists of light novels
Lists of manga volumes and chapters